Fling, internationally titled Lie to Me, is an independent comedy film about a couple navigating the hazards of an open relationship. It is the directorial debut of director John Stewart Muller and stars Brandon Routh, Steve Sandvoss, Courtney Ford, Nick Wechsler, Shoshana Bush and Ellen Hollman. It is the first feature from Santa Monica-based Steele Films and was written and produced by John Stewart Muller and his partner Laura Boersma.

Fling features Brandon Routh in his first lead role since Superman Returns. It premiered to a sold-out crowd at the 2008 Newport Beach Film Festival on April 26 in the  Lido Theater on the Balboa Peninsula. The film received an award for "Outstanding Achievement in Filmmaking" from the festival's jury.

Fling had its official Los Angeles premiere on October 18 at the Fine Arts Theatre on Wilshire Blvd. as part of the 2008 LA Femme Film Festival.

Shortly thereafter, it had its sold-out East Coast premiere on November 7 at the 2008 Fort Lauderdale International Film Festival. On November 14, Fling had its Midwest premiere at the Screenland Theatre in the Crossroads District of Kansas City, Missouri.

Fling had its international premiere at the 2008 Bahamas International Film Festival on December 5, 2008. North American distribution is being handled by Peace Arch Entertainment and the DVD was released on March 24, 2009.

Plot
By all appearances, Samantha (Courtney Ford) and Mason (Steve Sandvoss) are the perfect couple:  young, attractive, successful, and madly in love. At her sister Allison's (Ellen Hollman) idyllic spring wedding, Samantha, a twenty-something fashion designer, finds herself drawn back into the arms of her ex-boyfriend, James (Brandon Routh), a surprise wedding guest. Meanwhile, Mason, a published novelist just shy of thirty, spends a flirtatious evening culminating in a hot tub encounter with his best friend Luke's (Nick Wechsler) 18-year-old sister, Olivia (Shoshana Bush). Sneaking out of James's room, Sam is startled by Mason and confesses her affair. But Mason's reaction is not what is expected.

Cast
 Brandon Routh - James
 Steve Sandvoss - Mason
 Courtney Ford - Sam
 Shoshana Bush - Olivia
 Nick Wechsler - Luke
 Ellen Hollman - Alison
 Deborah Rush - Katherine
 Mousa Kraish - Patrick
 Diana Newton - Amy
 Mary Kay Riley - Brooke
 Erin McGrane - Becky
 Ginny Weirick - Jessica
 Makinna Ridgway - Jenni
 Brandon Lee White - Josh
 Lahcen Anajjar - Tom
 Tamar Kaprelian - Kim
 Brenner Barclay - Pete
Frank Munroe - Party Guy

The supporting cast includes Mousa Kraish, Deborah Rush, Tamar Kaprelian, Diana Newton, and Joshua C. Hunt.

Production
Fling features original music by Nick Urata, the frontman for the band DeVotchKa, whose work on the Little Miss Sunshine soundtrack resulted in a Grammy nomination.

The film was shot in and around Kansas City, Missouri.

Reception
Robert W. Butler of The Kansas City Star gave Fling 3/4, calling it "an impressive first feature."

References

External links
 
 
 Fling at the 2008 Fort Lauderdale International Film Festival
 Fling at the 2008 Newport Beach Film Festival
 Fling at the 2008 Bahamas International Film Festival

2008 films
American independent films
2008 directorial debut films
2000s English-language films
2000s American films